Dragons' Den is a Canadian television reality show based on the internationally franchised Dragons' Den format which began in Japan. The show debuted on October 3, 2006, on CBC Television, and is hosted by Dianne Buckner. Aspiring Canadian entrepreneurs pitch business and investment ideas to a panel of venture capitalists (termed "Dragons") in the hope of securing business financing and partnerships. The show also has a Quebec-only spin-off called Dans l'oeil du Dragon (literally 'in the Dragon's eye').

As of October 27, 2022, 272 episodes of Dragons' Den have aired.

Format
Each typical episode features approximately eight pitches, along with a brief synopsis of a further three pitches which usually were rejected by the Dragons.

Each pitch begins with the entrepreneur specifying the amount they are seeking as an investment and the percentage of their business that they are offering in exchange. Entrepreneurs generally describe their business and provide financial details in respect of their costs, sales, and profit margins. Pitches range from those at the conceptual stage to full-fledged long-term businesses. The Dragons ask the entrepreneur questions in order to assess whether their business is one which they would consider investing in. Each Dragon ultimately will either make an offer to invest or will declare that they are "out", meaning they are not interested in the business. Once all five Dragons are "out", the pitch ends.

While some entrepreneurs are made offers of exactly what they are seeking, most of the offers the Dragons make either seek a greater percentage of the business (equity) or seek a royalty on the sales of the business (this has become more prevalent in later seasons). The entrepreneurs and Dragons may then engage in negotiations until the available offers are either accepted (and a "deal" is made) or rejected.

While Dragons often partner up and make joint offers, they just as often make competing offers. Each of the Dragons has a unique set of skills and connections which sometimes results in the entrepreneur being forced to choose between offers (which might be offering the same or different economic terms) based on the "added" value the specific Dragon would bring to the business.

The main "rule" as set out at the start of every episode is that the entrepreneur is not permitted to accept an offer or multiple offers unless they would receive a total investment of at least the amount that they initially sought. The main ramification of this restriction is that entrepreneurs are often criticised for over-valuing their businesses. This is because the amount sought by the entrepreneur may be more than 50% of the value of their business as perceived by the Dragons (the Dragons rarely make deals for greater than 50%) and sometimes more than the entire value of the business as perceived by the Dragons. The restriction means the Dragons cannot offer a lesser amount that is more in line with their perceived value of the business.

Notwithstanding the acceptance of offers on the show, and the handshake agreements, the offers on the show are generally subject to due diligence by both parties and many "deals" made on the show do not ultimately close or close at different terms than originally expected. The show sometimes offers updates on both deals which were made and entrepreneurs who were rejected, including certain special episodes focusing exclusively on updates.

Dragons

Timeline of Dragons

Current Dragons 
 Arlene Dickinson (Seasons 2–9, 12–present), the owner of Venture, a marketing company with offices across Canada. Announced she would be leaving the show February 13, 2015 to pursue other career aspirations. She returned in season 12.
 Robert Herjavec (Seasons 1–6, 17–present), founder of an IT security firm that he sold at the height of the dot-com bubble for over $30.2 million. Currently head of IT security firm "The Herjavec Group". He can still be seen on Shark Tank.
 Manjit Minhas (Season 10–present), CEO of Minhas Craft Brewery.
 Michele Romanow (Season 10–present), Internet entrepreneur.
Vincenzo Guzzo (Season 13–present), Executive Vice-President and C.O.O. of Cinémas Guzzo. Guzzo was also a 'Guest Dragon' on the current season of the Quebec version.
Wes Hall (Season 16–present), founder and executive chairman of Kingsdale Advisors and founder and chairman of The BlackNorth Initiative.

Former Dragons
 Jim Treliving (Season 1–15), a former Royal Canadian Mounted Police officer and co-owner of Boston Pizza and Mr. Lube.
 Kevin O'Leary (Seasons 1–8), co-host of CBC News Network's business news series The Lang and O'Leary Exchange. O'Leary is the former president of The Learning Company, which was sold to Mattel for $4.2 billion in 1999.  He also appears on the US version of the show, Shark Tank. On March 14, 2014, it was announced that O'Leary would not be returning to the show for season 9. On January 18, 2017, O'Leary announced his campaign for Leader of the Conservative Party of Canada.
 Laurence Lewin (Seasons 1 & 2), co-founder of La Senza, a chain of lingerie shops with more than 310 stores throughout Canada, and, through corporate licensees, a further 320 stores operating in 30 countries around the world. Lewin left the show for health reasons and died on November 12, 2008. The show broadcast a dedication in memory of him on November 17, 2008.
 Jennifer Wood (Season 1), an executive in Canada's beef industry. Her career in the cattle business began in 1990.
 W. Brett Wilson (Seasons 3–5) is a founder of FirstEnergy Capital Corp, a part owner of the English football team Derby County, and a minor partner in NHL's Nashville Predators team. During his time on the show, he brokered more business deals than any other Dragon on any version of the show worldwide. Said to be the most philanthropically-minded of the Canadian Dragons, he has been involved in numerous charities and participated in a CBC staff video for the online It Gets Better Project. Wilson left the show following season 5. In interviews following the announcement of his departure, Wilson criticized the show's producers for sticking to a format that favoured "abuse" and "criticism", rather than offering constructive guidance and feedback to potential entrepreneurs. He subsequently announced his own entrepreneurship-themed series, Risky Business, to air on Slice.
 Bruce Croxon (Seasons 6–8) entrepreneur.
 Michael Wekerle (Season 9–12), founder and CEO of Difference Capital.
 Joe Mimran (Season 10–12), fashion retailer formerly associated with Club Monaco and Joe Fresh.
 Lane Merrifield (Season 13–15), co-founded FreshGrade in 2011 and has since served in multiple roles, including his current position as CEO. He was previously the co-founder and CEO of Club Penguin, the largest virtual world for kids, leading the company to rapid growth and an eventual acquisition by Disney in 2007 for $350 million. After the acquisition, he spent five years as Executive Vice President of Disney Online Studios.

Reception
The skeptic community criticized a twelfth-season episode of Dragons' Den for its handling of a wellness company claiming to be able to improve neurological function from a distance. The company, NeuroReset, presented pieces of copper that clip onto the user's clothing and sell for $80. The founders, a golf coach and a chiropractor, claimed that the operating principle of the clips was quantum entanglement. After applying pressure to some of the investors, with and without the clips, the pair convinced five of the six Dragons to buy equity. Manjit Minhas, while not part of the final deal, expressed interest in the product as well. After the taping of the episode, the agreement fell apart in due diligence and Health Canada ruled that three NeuroReset products must be removed from sale. Joe Mimran admitted that he was deceived by the pitch.

Overview

Episode description

Awards
 On June 13, 2011, Dragons' Den was named best reality program at the Banff World Television Festival.
 Canadian Screen Award for Best Reality/Competition Program or Series
 Gemini Award for Best Reality Program or Series

Spin-offs
Two spinoff shows featuring Dragons on their own have been created, Redemption Inc. with Kevin O'Leary, and, The Big Decision with Arlene Dickinson & Jim Treliving.

References

External links

 

CBC Television original programming
Canadian television series based on non-Canadian television series
Non-Japanese television series based on Japanese television series
2000s Canadian reality television series
2010s Canadian reality television series
2020s Canadian reality television series
2006 Canadian television series debuts
Television series by Sony Pictures Television
Television shows filmed in Toronto
Business mass media in Canada
Business-related television series
English-language television shows
Gemini and Canadian Screen Award for Best Reality Series winners